Ljubisav (Cyrillic script: Љубисав) is a Serbian masculine given name. Notable people with the given name include:

 Ljubisav Đokić
 Ljubisav Luković
 Ljubisav Rakić (born 1931), Serbian neurobiologist, professor, and academic

Serbian masculine given names